Cristofali is an Italian surname. Notable people with the surname include:

 Adriano Cristofali (1717-1788), Veronese architect, whose style bridged between Enlightenment-Baroque and Neoclassicism
 Bartolomeo Cristofori (1655-1731), Italian maker of musical instruments famous for inventing the piano

See also 
 Cristóbal (disambiguation)
 Cristofori (disambiguation)

Italian-language surnames
Patronymic surnames
Surnames from given names